Gordon Drummond Clancy (11 May 1912 – 16 February 1996) was a Progressive Conservative party member of the House of Commons of Canada. He was a pharmacist by career.

He was first elected at the Yorkton riding in the 1958 general election after an unsuccessful attempt to win the riding in 1957. After re-elections at Yorkton in 1962, 1963 and 1965, Clancy left federal politics and did not seek further re-election after completing his term in the 27th Canadian Parliament in 1968.

He died in 1996 and is buried in Semans.

References

External links
 

1912 births
1985 deaths
Members of the House of Commons of Canada from Saskatchewan
Progressive Conservative Party of Canada MPs